Podachaenium is a genus of Mesoamerican plants in the tribe Heliantheae within the family Asteraceae.

 Species
 Podachaenium chiapanum B.L.Turner & Panero - 	Chiapas
 Podachaenium eminens (Lag.) Sch.Bip. ex Sch.Bip. - from Sinaloa to Costa Rica
 Podachaenium pachyphyllum (Sch.Bip. ex Klatt) R.K.Jansen, N.A.Harriman & Urbatsch - Puebla, Oaxaca
 Podachaenium paniculatum Benth. - Costa Rica
 formerly included
see Squamopappus Verbesina 
 Podachaenium skutchii (S.F.Blake) H.Rob. - Squamopappus skutchii (S.F.Blake) R.K.Jansen, N.A.Harriman & Urbatsch
 Podachaenium standleyi (Steyerm.) B.L.Turner & Panero - Verbesina standleyi (Steyerm.) D.L.Nash

References

Asteraceae genera
Heliantheae
Flora of North America